Parapoynx medusalis is a moth in the family Crambidae. It was described by Francis Walker in 1859. It is found in São Paulo, Brazil and in Australia, where it has been recorded from Queensland.

References

Acentropinae
Moths described in 1859